Guy Montagu George Finch-Hatton, 14th Earl of Winchilsea and 9th Earl of Nottingham OBE DSC (28 May 1885 – 10 February 1939) was an English peer and banker. Finch-Hatton was brother to renowned big-game hunter Denys Finch Hatton and his daughter married Whitney Straight, of the American Whitney family.

Early life
Guy Montagu George Finch-Hatton was born on 28 May 1885. He was the son of Henry Finch-Hatton (1852–1927) and the former Anne Jane Codrington. His two siblings were Gladys Margaret Finch-Hatton (who married Capt. Osmond Williams, a son of Sir Osmond Williams, 1st Baronet) and Denys Finch Hatton, a noted big-game hunter.

Finch-Hatton's father was the second son of George Finch-Hatton, 10th Earl of Winchilsea by his third wife Frances Margaretta (née Rice) Finch-Hatton (the eldest daughter of Edward Royd Rice MP of Dane Court and Elizabeth Austen, daughter of Edward Austen Knight). through his paternal grandmother he is related to Jane Austen, through his great grandmother Lady Elizabeth Murray he is related to Earls of Mansfields.

His maternal grandparents were Admiral of the Fleet Sir Henry Codrington and Helen Jane (née Smith) Codrington (a daughter of C. Webb Smith).

He was educated at Eton and Magdalen College, Oxford.

Career
In 1908, he was Lieut with the Royal Engineers. During World War I, he served as Lt Cmdr Royal Naval Reserve from 1915 to 1917 and Lt Col Royal Air Force from 1917 to 1918. He was awarded Distinguished Service Cross and officer of the Order of the British Empire in 1919. From 1922 until his death in 1939, he was treasurer of St George's Hospital. In 1927, Finch-Hatton acceded to the title upon the death of his father, Henry Finch-Hatton, the 13th Earl of Winchilsea.

Shortly after his marriage in 1910, he became a member of the London Stock Exchange and a partner in the firm of Kitcat & Aitken, one of the leading firms of Bishopsgate Street. Lord Winchilsea was also a partner in securities firm of William P. Bonbright & Co. of London and New York. His brother-in-law John Armstrong Drexel was also a partner in the firm.

Personal life

On 8 June 1910, Viscount Maidstone married Margaretta Armstrong Drexel (1885–1952) at St Margaret's, Westminster by the Bishop of London. The reception was held at the Drexel home in Grosvenor Square. Margaretta, who had been presented at court in 1908 by Princess Louise Margaret of Prussia, the Duchess of Connaught, was the daughter of Margarita (née Armstrong) Drexel and Anthony Joseph Drexel Jr., and the granddaughter of Anthony Joseph Drexel, a member of the wealthy Philadelphia banking dynasty. Her parents divorced in 1917 and her mother married Brinsley FitzGerald (the son of Peter FitzGerald, 1st Baronet of Valencia) in 1918. Together, Guy and Margaretta were the parents of three children:

 Christopher Finch-Hatton, 15th Earl of Winchilsea (1911–1950), who married Countess Gladys Széchényi Sárvár-Felsövidék, daughter of Count László Széchényi Sárvár-Felsövidék, of the Hungarian noble Széchényi family, and Gladys Vanderbilt Széchenyi, a member of the American Vanderbilt family. They divorced in 1945 and he married Agnes Mary Conroy in 1946.
 Lady Daphne Margarita Finch-Hatton (1913–2003), who married Whitney Straight (1912–1979), a member of the Whitney family, in 1935.
 Lady Henrietta Diana Juanita Finch-Hatton (1917–1977), who married Peter Frank Tiarks (1910–1975).

Finch-Hatton died in London on 10 February 1939, at the age of 53 and was buried at Ewerby in Lincolnshire. His widow died in London in 1952.

References

1885 births
1939 deaths
14
709
People educated at West Downs School
Guy
20th-century English nobility
Royal Naval Reserve personnel